The following lists events that will happen during 2015 in Colombia.

Incumbents
 President: Juan Manuel Santos 
 Vice President: Germán Vargas Lleras

Events

 
2010s in Colombia
Colombia
Colombia
Years of the 21st century in Colombia